Bensbyn is a locality situated in Luleå Municipality, Norrbotten County, Sweden with 448 inhabitants in 2010.

References 

Populated places in Luleå Municipality
Norrbotten